María Celeste Pelayes Guillén (born 26 December 1983), known as Celeste Pelayes, is a Guatemalan retired footballer who played as a forward. She has been a member of the Guatemala women's national team.

International career
Pelayes capped for Guatemala at senior level during the 2012 CONCACAF Women's Olympic Qualifying Tournament.

References

1983 births
Living people
Guatemalan women's footballers
Guatemala women's international footballers
Women's association football forwards
Guatemalan women's futsal players